International Expo Center is a station on International Expo Branch of Line 6 of Chongqing Rail Transit in Chongqing Municipality, China. It is located in Yubei District.

References

Yubei District
Railway stations in Chongqing
Chongqing Rail Transit stations